Lucky Jim is a 1909 short film directed by D. W. Griffith. It was produced by the Biograph Company and starred Marion Leonard and Mack Sennett. Originally released in a split-reel with Twin Brothers (1909), prints of the film still exist today.

Cast
Marion Leonard - Gertrude
Mack Sennett - Jack
Herbert Yost - Jim, the First Husband
Anita Hendrie - The Mother
David Miles - The Father
Harry Solter - Jim's Friend

also uncredited
Linda Arvidson - Wedding Guest
Billy Bitzer
John R. Cumpson - Wedding Guest
Francis R. Grandon - 
Grace Henderson - 
Charles Inslee - Wedding Guest
Arthur V. Johnson - Wedding Guest
Florence Lawrence - Wedding Guest
Owen Moore - Wedding Guest

References

External links
 

Lucky Jim available for free download at Internet Archive

1909 films
Silent American drama films
American silent short films
Films directed by D. W. Griffith
Biograph Company films
1909 drama films
American black-and-white films
1900s American films